The PDP-4 was the successor to the Digital Equipment Corporation's PDP-1.

History
This 18-bit machine, first shipped in 1962,  was a compromise: "with slower memory and different packaging" than the PDP-1, but priced at $65,000 - less than half the price of its predecessor.  All later 18-bit PDP machines (7, 9 and 15) are based on a similar, but enlarged instruction set, more powerful than, but based on the same concepts as, the 12-bit PDP-5/PDP-8 series. 

Approximately 54 were sold.

Hardware

The system's memory cycle was 8 microseconds, compared to 5 microseconds for the PDP-1.

Mass storage
Both the PDP-1 and the PDP-4 were introduced as paper tape-based systems. The only use, if any, for IBM-compatible 200 BPI or 556 BPI magnetic tape was for data.  The use of "mass storage" drums - not even a megabyte and non-removable - were an available option, but were not in the spirit of the “personal” or serially shared systems that DEC offered.

It was in this setting that DEC introduced DECtape, initially called "MicroTape", for both the PDP-1 and PDP-4.

Software
DEC provided an editor, an assembler, and a FORTRAN II compiler.  The assembler was different from that of the PDP-1 in two ways:
 Unlike the PDP-1, macros were not supported.
 It was a one-pass assembler; paper-tape input did not have to be read twice.

Photos
 PDP-4

See also
 Programmed Data Processor

References

DEC minicomputers
18-bit computers
Transistorized computers
Computer-related introductions in 1962